Agni Poolu was a 2012 Indian Telugu-language television series that premiered on 13 August 2012 on Gemini TV.

Plot 

Agnipoolu was made under the banner of Srikanth Entertainments Pvt.Ltd. It is  based on the friendships and emotional bondage of four girls and on moral values of humanity, it has some bad characters also who torture the good innocent people for their selfish motives. We get a lot of lessons to learn from the characters besides a great entertainment.

"Agnipulu" literally means "Fire Flowers". They can face sun's heat and wild storms and yet stand fresh and still on the branches without losing their softness and brilliant shine. The tree also gives shelter to many lives until it can. The characters of the four girls are symbolised as "fire flowers" trying to do something always for the good of society with their great intentions, honesty and perseverance.

The story starts with Swamidass (son of a rich village head of Suravaram village) managing to put his rival Govind Master in a secret cell in Cherlapally Jail using his influence with the help of one S.I., as he learned that Parvathi, whom he was loving, was in love with that master. Then, he managed to marry her with the help of her own parents who also did not like Govind Master. Thereafter, Swamidass becomes M.P. and began living in Hyderabad with Parvati and their son Viren.

But one secret was hidden by Parvathi's mother which was not known to Parvati and even Swamidass. Parvathi was pregnant before her marriage and gave birth to a son but her mother told Parvati that she gave birth to a still born. Parvati believed it and hence she agreed to marry Swamidass as Govind Master was missing.

That child was named Prithvi and brought up secretly for some years in the shelter of that S.I. at Suravaram and after he grew up and began going to school, he was taken to the place in Hyderabad where Govindji was kept and everything has been revealed by Parvati's mother to Govindji about the child. But she requested Gobind to keep it secret till the end of his life for the sake of Parvati. The S.I.also warns Govindji of bad consequences if truth is revealed. All this was hidden from Prithvi also. The child was simply told that Govindji is a great teacher and would be of great help to his studies and career if he maintained regular contacts with him.

Now many years passed on and Prithvi becomes a lawyer. He is a young man with great ideals of life. He feels much worried at the crimes and corruption in society and wants to do justice by bringing the culprits to book. Prithvi's bondage with Govindji also grew up along with time. They could not live without seeing and talking to each other. He used to visit Govindji at least once in a week. One day Prithvi comes across an incident in which a poor woman died after giving birth to a child because of the traffic jams during an election rally of Swamidass' party men. Prithvi gives moral support and financial help to the old helpless guardians of the child and encouraged them to lodge FIR against Swamidass. Viren the son of Swamidass learns of this and developed enmity with Prithvi for defaming his father.

Prithvi during his activities against corruption, happens to meet with Krishnamoorthy, an editor of "Nijam" (Truth) newspaper and through him with his daughter Neelaveni. Neelaveni, daughter of Krishnamoorthy is a news reader in TV channel. She, being a lover of books comes closer to Prithvi who also loved books.

Neelaveni is shortly known as Neelu by her friends. Her friends Rajyalakshmi, Mythili and Sonia. All the four friends love each other very deeply and regularly meet each other and share things and help each other when in need. They admire Mili who was running orphanage and giving shelter to children along with a Christian Nun whom Mili addresses as Sister, but regards her as her own mother as Mili is orphan, herself. As all her friends were well aware of her financial conditions they also used to contribute occasionally for her orphanage. The elder lady (Sister) used to take care of the children at the orphanage when Mili used to be in office. She admired Mili with great love and affection overwhelmed by her unselfish sacrifice for the sake of those children at such a tender age instead of enjoying life like other people.

When Mili was small and studying in school, she had a friend named Shyam Charan shortly known as Sherry who was close to her and was kind and helpful to her. They were best friends. But after some years, they had to part as he went away along with his parents to foreign country for his higher studies. When he returns to India and established his own advertisement agency, he wanted to meet Mili and express his love to her. He finds the whereabouts of her by making Facebook friendship with her in fictitious name. But he got some doubts. Whether she still remembers him and loves him as he does? So he do not go directly to reveal himself. But goes to the office of Mili and meets her boss and introduces himself and offers some contract to promote their business. Mili did not recognize him as many years had passed and he has grown up.

Another friend Sonu's parents who are Doctors  have their own Nursing home. Sonu has one younger brother who is studying MBBS even though he is not interested in it and wanted to be a great photographer.. Sonu has done MBA but she did not like to work with her parents. Her ambition was to become a great model. Even though her parents wanted her to look after their hospital, she anyhow manages in taking their consent for her going to Mumbai in search of her goal and reaches Mumbai.

Raju who got job as HR in the company of Swamidass, is very smart, active, beautiful and simple in nature. Her mother is also a working woman who lost her husband very early and brought up Raju on her own with great love and care. Even though Raju has grown up to a young woman and is HR of a company, she still behaves like a child with her mum and loves to be caressed by her like a little child.

Viren, son of Swamidass, is smart and good looking but he was spoilt due to excessive love and freedom from his father. Swamidass let him do whatever he does and gave away money to spend lavishly with his friends who used to celebrate parties and enjoy life without knowing any responsibilities. On continuous insistence of Parvathi, Viren was made to attend office and look after the company work even though unwillingly. There in the office, he watches Raju performing all duties very smartly and without any confusion. He gets attracted at her sincerity in work and seeing her, he learns to take interest in business matters and began catching everything.

Viren's mother Parvathi also started to attend office as she is the Managing Director of the company. Swamidass and Viren did not like her going to office. But they could not stop her. She supervised all work with the help of Rajyalakshmi. She gets much attracted by the smartness and humbleness of Raju and thinks of making her as her daughter-in-law by getting Viren married to her. She revealed her intention to Raju's mother who felt very happy for this offer. But Swamidass did not agree. He was thinking of his own personal, political gains by getting Viren married to a great business man's daughter so that Viren can become C.M.as per assurances of that business man Gaurishanker. He was afraid that Viren is getting attracted by Raju's personality. So he wanted to stop the story there by threatening Raju's mother of severe consequences if she allowed her daughter to advance at Viren.

In the meantime, there was a function organized by Suravaram College for old students of their college and invitations were received by Swamidass, Parvathi and Krishnamurthy to attend the function. Swamidass did not like to remember old things. So he did not go. Parvathi goes there alone after her son also refused to go with her. There she meets Krishnamurthy and recognises him and enquires him whether any clue was known of Govindji in so many years. Krishnamurthy tells her that nothing was known and they feel very sad.

Krishnamurthy attended the function along with Prithvi who was interested in visiting Suravaram, the place of his childhood, to meet somebody he might know. When Prithvi found one S.I. there overseeing the security arrangements along with other cops, he recalled his memories when he had been taken to Govind Master by one S.I. resembling that same face but was unable to recognize him. So he goes to the S.I. and enquires him whether he was his uncle who had taken him to Govindji. The S.I. gets shocked to see him there and immediately denies the fact to escape from him. After sometime Krishnamurthy, who returned from the function also recognises the S.I. to whom he had gone many years ago to lodge complaint regarding the missing of Govind Master. So he also goes to the S.I. and inquires him whether he had recognised him and the whereabouts of Govindji. But the S.I. escapes from him also saying that he did not know him or Govindji. Both Krishnamurthy and Prithvi do not believe the words of that S.I.

When Parvati was at Suravaram, Swamidass gets Raju's mother kidnapped and threatens her with a pistol to leave the city along with her daughter as soon as possible if she wanted her daughter's life. She gets much frightened and worries for Raju. But she could not tell her anything as she loved her very much and did not want to make her sad and disturbed. But as she was very nervous, she goes to Raju's office to take her to temple and pray God to save their lives. When they were going to temple, Swamidass with the aid of his men gets them meet with an accident by getting the car brakes removed. Raju gets serious head injury in that accident and her mother got some minor injury as she was made to jump from the moving vehicle by Raju before accident.

In the meantime, Sonu who had gone to Mumbai gets her money and luggage stolen by thieves and was helpless. Just then a good young man known as Abbas sees her miserable condition and helps her and takes her to his friend Mala's house. Mala at first did not like to keep her with her but later agrees as Abbas insists. Abbas is a very good young fellow of that locality and is of very kind, lovely and helping nature to all people. So everybody of that locality loved and respected him. Further he has many contacts with all kinds of business people as he used to help them also in many ways. Mala has come to Mumbai just like Sonu with big aspirations but had to settle down with circumstances and she had a small son with her. Sonu used to assist Mala and look after her child to please her and gain her love.

Sonu in her search for modelling career lands in many troubles. Once she was duped by some person in the pretext of providing her work. She was told to attend a place one night for audition and they tried to molest her. But any how she escaped from there but was caught by police on the road who booked her as a prostitute working in nights and put her in jail for 3 days. After much effort, Abbas gets her released. Then Abbas introduces Sonu to the assistant of Shyam Charan, who was friend of Mili and owner of a big ad agency. That assistant was known to Abbas but he could not convince Shyam Charan to give Sonu a chance. Even though Sonu gets discouraged with all the happenings, she determines not to leave her goal at any cost.

Shyam was trying his best to get nearer to Mili by making her recognise him as her childhood friend through many indirect means instead of straight forwardly telling her all the facts. But Mili understood him as a bad charactered person who was trying to seduce her as she did not recognise him in spite of all his efforts. She began scolding him instead of understanding him. So Shyam decided to leave this indirect approach and decided to tell her that he is her childhood friend. But when he tells her the fact, she did not believe him and thought he is deceiving her by taking undue advantage of her politeness and endurance. So she fires at him and scolds severely and tells that even if he was really her Shyam she did not care for him as he had deceived her all these days by concealing the truth. She further tells him  that he had no confidence in her love and so adopted all those indirect means thereby hurting her feelings. So she asks him to go away and never to show his face again to her. Her heart gets broken and she weeps very much after his leaving.

Now Shyam Charan also gets broken and he curses himself for all that was done by him. So he tells his assistant to look after the whole work at Mumbai by himself and to book a flight ticket for him and returns to US without giving any contact number or details of his whereabouts to him.

Mili later realises her fault in insulting Shyam for what he had done. and shares everything with her  Godmother who consoles Mili and tells her that whatever Shyam did was for her sake only and she should not have insulted him as he had no bad intentions. Mili also realises this fact. She immediately tried to contact him. But his phone was switched off as he had already left Mumbai. So she feels very depressed. But her friend Neelu consoles her and advises her to leave all work and go immediately to Mumbai to trace him and say sorry to him. Mili was happy at this advice but was undecided because of her responsibilities towards the orphanage. Neelu promises to take care of her orphanage and persuades her to start immediately in search of her love.

Prithvi who had returned from Suravaram was again and again thinking of the SI who had lied with him. He again and again tries to weave all incidents connecting together and arrive at some conclusion. He asks Govindji also to tell about his history. But Govind Master was afraid of thinking about past as it may destroy Prithvi's future. So he keeps silent and Prithvi gets frustrated. But Neelu and her father Krishnamurthy console him and give him some relief.

Mili reaches Mumbai and stays with Sonu. Abbas takes her to the office of Shyam Charan's ad agency. But on reaching there, the assistant-cum-friend of Shyam tells them that Shyam is not in India. They try the mobile number but it repeatedly tells that mobile of Shyam is switched off. Mili breaks down as she felt she could never meet Shyam again in her life. But Sonu, Abbas and that assistant of Shyam ask her not to lose confidence and be positive saying that her deep love for Shyam will bring him back to her. But she decides to return to Hyderabad and gets her ticket booked through Abbas. But when she was seen off on the train by  her friend Sonu and Abbas with deep sorrow and as they return to the cab, to their surprise they found Mili already standing there before their reach. Mili was very sad and did not like to return without finding Shyam. So she descended the train and came back. They were happy that she did not go.

Shyam also missed his love and considered returning to India. So he suddenly reached Mumbai one day and was sleeping when his assistant returns there. Finding him on the bed his assistant was very happy and after awakening him tells him all that had happened. Shyam was pleased to learn that Mili searched for him. But he felt very sad when he was told that she had returned to Hyderabad. Both of them immediately go to Sonu's house to express his sorry for all that had happened and requests Sonu to convey his feelings and message to Mili. Sonu scolds him and tells him that he had given too much tension to Mili. But, in the meantime Mili comes from inside and greets Shyam. Shyam and his assistant were surprised to see her there and to know she had not left.

There in Hyderabad, Raju was admitted into the hospital by her mother, who also was injured, with the help of some people gathered at the site of their accident. Doctors tell that Raju's case is sensitive and put her in ICU. Raju's mother informs Neelaveni and tells her to inform her other friends also. Neelu gets shocked at the news and rushes to the hospital immediately along with Prithvi. In the meantime, Viren also learns of the accident as Raju had not attended the office. He also goes to see her at the hospital but there he finds Prithvi already present along with Neelaveni. Seeing Prithvi he gets irritated and could not control himself. Any how he meets Raju's mother and afterwards informs his father Swamidass about the accident and requests him to talk with the Doctors to take full care of the patient and put all their efforts for her speedy recovery.

Just when Sonu, Mili, Abbas, Shyam and his friend were still talking themselves after Shyam's meeting with Mili, the news of Raju's accident was given to them by Raju's mother and Neelu. Sonu and Mili also get shocked and weep for Raju. They immediately decide to go to Hyderabad to visit her. Their flight tickets were booked by Shyam and he also offers to help them if any need arises. They reach Hyderabad along with Abbas and go to the hospital and seeing her condition in ICU they feel very sad. Neelu was also present there along with her father Krishnamurthy and friend Prithvi. There they see Viren insulting Prithvi and telling him not to come there. All of them get puzzled at Viren's behaviour. After some time Sonu had to return to Mumbai as she had some pre-determined appointments. Sonu does not want to leave until Raju regains consciousness but Mili and Abbas advise her not to spoil her career. Further Mili promises Sonu that immediately on Raju getting conscious, she will inform her. So Sonu returns with Abbas.

In the meantime, Parvati also learns of Raju's accident on her return from Suravaram. She goes to the hospital along with her husband and consoles Raju's mother. She tells her that she will take full care of Raju and will take her to her home for proper personal care and treatment and assures Raju's mother that everything will be okay. Then Parvati tells Swaminath to talk to doctors for taking Raju to their home. Swaminath did not like this. It is he who had created the accident to Raju and her mother to get rid of them. But Parvati was asking to get their treatment in his home which was not at all acceptable to him. But Viren also tells him that mother's idea is very good in taking Raju to their home for better treatment. So he had to agree for the time being.

Meanwhile, Neelu and Prithvi have got some doubts about the accident as Neelu tells him that Raju is a perfect driver and there is no scope of accident in her driving. So Prithvi goes to the vehicle which was given for repair by the police and enquires the mechanic about the problem in the vehicle. The mechanic tells him that it had no engine problem but brake wire has been cut by some body. Then Prithvi comes to the conclusion that it was a pre-planned murder attempt. But he and Neelu know that there are no enemies to Raju and her mother as they are very good-natured and simple. They meet Raju's mother also and enquire from her telling her that it was a planned accident. But as she was afraid of Swamidass she bluntly refuses their argument saying they have no enemies. But any how Prithvi wanted to lodge a complaint in the police that it was a murder attempt. He went there taking the mechanic to lodge complaint. But the mechanic reverses his statement in front of the police as by that time he had been bribed and warned by Swamidass men to not reveal the truth. So Prithvi had to return from there red faced.

Now as Raju's treatment had been arranged in Swamidass house, Raju's mother also is with her and friends and well wishers are coming and going. But Prithvi coming to their house along with Neelu and Krishnamurthy was not acceptable to Viren as Prithvi tried to defame his father. He could not control on seeing Prithvi and began quarrelling with him and sent him out. Raju who got consciousness by that time gets shocked at his behaviour and starts hating him. But Viren was so high tempered that he loses control over his wits and despite his mother stopping him goes with rage to the room of Raju and tells Raju and her mother to leave their house immediately if they continue to allow people to visit them who are not liked by him or his father. Raju's heart becomes broken at his behaviour and takes it as a prestigious issue and immediately asks her mother to take her home from that place. So they take ambulance and return to their home.

Meanwhile, Viren becomes more disturbed at their leaving his house and thinks all this was due to Prithvi. His anger on him grows too much and consuming alcohol he goes to Prithvi's house and begins shouting and quarrelling with him. Parvati, who had seen Viren taking Pistol and going in anger, followed him and reached Prithvi's house where she hears the shouting of Viren and Prithvi. Immediately she rushes into their room and seeing Viren holding pistol, she goes nearer to him to stop him. Prithvi also was trying to catch hold of the pistol to throw it away from his hands. In that confusion, the bullet shot by Viren at Prithvi hits Parvati and she drops to the ground with a scream and becomes unconscious and a lot of bleeding takes place. Immediately, Prithvi asks to take her to hospital and tries to help Viren. But Viren did not allow him and takes her to his car and after putting her in the back seat begins driving. In the meanwhile Prithvi calls ambulance with oxygen cylinders and she was shifted by them into the ambulance and put on oxygen and taken to the hospital.

All these incidents in Agni Poolu serial show to what extent anger and hatred can take a man that his own people become victims. And on the other hand Love. How unselfish and pure it is that it bonds people of different places and different communities and brings them together so that they begin to live for each other and sacrifice themselves for their beloveds.

References

Telugu-language television shows
Gemini TV original programming